Shawforth is a ward in the township of Whitworth within the Rossendale borough of Lancashire, England. It lies amongst the South Pennines along the course of the River Spodden and A671 road.

Shawforth in the Middle Ages was a hamlet within the township of Spotland and parish of Rochdale.

Shawforth railway station served Shawforth from 1881 until its closure in 1947.

It is part of the Rossendale and Darwen constituency, with Jake Berry having been the Member of Parliament since 2010.

References
Notes

Bibliography

External links

Villages in Lancashire
Geography of the Borough of Rossendale